Fred Perry defeated Don Budge 2–6, 6–2, 8–6, 1–6, 10–8 in the final to win the men's singles tennis title at the 1936 U.S. National Championships.

It would be Perry's final Grand Slam tournament victory, as well as his final appearance before turning professional. Perry's victory would be the last for a British man in a Grand Slam singles event until Andy Murray won the successor to this tournament, the US Open, in 2012.

Seeds
The tournament used two lists of players for seeding the men's singles event; one for U.S. players and one for foreign players. Fred Perry is the champion; others show the round in which they were eliminated. 

U.S.
  Don Budge (finalist)
  Bryan Grant (semifinals)
  Sidney Wood (fourth round)
  Frank Parker (semifinals)
  Bobby Riggs (fourth round)
  Gregory Mangin (quarterfinals)
  John McDiarmid (quarterfinals)
  Hal Surface (second round)

Foreign
  Fred Perry (champion)
  Bernard Destremau (fourth round)
  Jacques Brugnon (third round)
  Yvon Petra (fourth round)
  Pierre Pellizza (fourth round)

Draw

Key
 Q = Qualifier
 WC = Wild card
 LL = Lucky loser
 r = Retired

Finals

Earlier rounds

Section 1

Section 2

Section 3

Section 4

Section 5

Section 6

Section 7

Section 8

References

External links
 1936 U.S. National Championships on ITFtennis.com, the source for this draw

Men's Singles
1936